Acrocercops albidorsella is a moth of the family Gracillariidae, known from Guadalcanal Island and Rennell Island, in the Solomon Islands. It was described by J.D. Bradley in 1957.

References

albidorsella
Moths described in 1957
Moths of Oceania